Shawkat Ali Khan pen-name Khan Shein Kunwar, is a short story writer from Kolkata, India, who has written hundreds of short stories on different current topics regularly published in various newspapers and magazines throughout the country. His first book, Faaslon Ka Safar, consisting of 37 short stories was published in May 2008.

Fiction
Sulagte lamhon ka karb
Manzar pas manzar
Chikhti ruhen
Tafseel-e-besada
Funn-e-jadeed
Zakhmon ki sej par
Lashon ka karb
Bizan
Khayaal khayaal zindagi
Maujood la maujood
Saraab
Nejaat
Sapne jo bikhar gaye....
Sufaid posh
Rezaa rezaa khwab
Sarguzisht
Tarteeb-e-jawedan
Zakhmon ki gawahi
Badalte mausam ki sadaa
Ek rupya ka aadmi
Koshish-e-naatawan
Gaam gaam saraab
Khuli ankho ke khwab
....Aur kahani ban gayee

Notes

See also
List of Urdu language writers
Urdu literature

Writers from Kolkata
Urdu-language fiction writers
1955 births
Indian Muslims
People from Ghazipur
Living people
20th-century Indian short story writers
People from Uttar Pradesh